The Council of Christian Churches of an African Approach in Europe (CCCAAE) is a Christian ecumenical organization established in 2001. It is a member of the World Council of Churches.

External links 
World Council of Churches listing

Christian organizations established in 2001
Members of the World Council of Churches
Christianity in Europe
Regional councils of churches